Meta E. Pelham (1855–1941) was an American journalist and clubwoman. She wrote for the Detroit Plaindealer.

Early life 
Meta E. Pelham was born in the free black community of Fredericksburg, Virginia in 1855, to Robert A. Pelham and Frances (Butcher) Pelham. The family, including younger brother Robert Pelham Jr., moved to Detroit, Michigan. Pelham was one of only four black students in her class, and she graduated valedictorian. She then attended Fenton College Normal School in central Michigan.

Career 

Pelham briefly taught school in the American south, but returned home to Detroit due to bad health. Around 1886, she joined the editorial staff of the Detroit Plaindealer as a writer. She wrote for other newspapers as well. By historian Gloria Wade-Gayles's count, Pelham was one of 46 black newswomen whose work was published between 1883 and 1905.

Pelham was a member of the Michigan State Association of Colored Women (a chapter of the National Association of Colored Women), the Detroit Study Club, and the Detroit Federation of Women's Clubs.

In 1925, Pelham encouraged African-American women to join her in the field of journalism or to help fund a black newspaper, so that positive news about the African-American Detroiters would reach the public.

Death 
Pelham died in 1941. She is buried in the Pelham family plot in Elmwood Cemetery, Detroit.

References 

1855 births
1941 deaths
African-American journalists
Clubwomen
20th-century African-American people
People from Detroit
People from Fredericksburg, Virginia